The Armilla patrol was the name of the Royal Navy's permanent presence in the Persian Gulf during the 1980s and 1990s.

Background
The Royal Navy withdrew its forces from the Persian Gulf in 1971 (the former Flag Officer, Middle East, and Senior Naval Officer, Persian Gulf) in line with the United Kingdom's general retreat from "East of Suez". However, tensions in the area remained high and Royal Navy ships were still a frequent sight in the area. In 1980, tensions in the Middle East led to the outbreak of war between Iraq and Iran. There has been at least one Royal Navy ship on patrol in the area ever since. In addition to the surface combatant, the Royal Navy has also maintained an auxiliary of the Royal Fleet Auxiliary (RFA) in the Persian Gulf.

During the Falklands war, the Royal New Zealand Navy dispatched frigates to carry out the Armilla patrol duties, freeing the British ships on station for service with the Royal Navy task force tasked with freeing the Falkland Islands from the Argentine invasion.

The Armilla patrol was praised by British Prime Minister Margaret Thatcher and a call was made in parliament for an Armilla Patrol Medal to go to those serving in the Patrol at the time in 1989. Ships Companies were subsequently awarded the General Service Medal (Gulf) for patrol and escort duties between 17 November 1986 and 31 October 31 October 1988. Mine countermeasures ships were awarded the GSM for service between 1 November 1988 until 28 February 1989.

Typical Armilla patrol deployments lasted for six months or so, with the supporting RFA vessel sometimes spending an aggregate total of over a year in the area. The patrol was reinforced with an aircraft carrier or task group in times of high tension or British involvement in wartime operations or by frigates or destroyers transiting the area for other operations in the Far East or Pacific.

The largest British presence in the Persian Gulf during the Armilla patrol was during the two operations against Iraq. In 1991, eight Royal Navy ships supported by a number of RFA vessels were sent to the area.

Post 1990s
In 2003, over 30 British warships and auxiliaries were involved in the invasion of Iraq. A number of vessels, including minesweepers, survey vessels and submarines, are periodically rotated through the area to provide additional capability.

Beginning in 2006 the surface combatant deployed was tasked with patrol in the Persian Gulf and as part of Operation Oracle, the United Kingdom's assistance to the United States in its operations in the Arabian Sea, along with flexibility in tasking for operations in the Far East and Pacific.

See also

Standing Royal Navy deployments

References

External links
 Royal Navy: Operations (royalnavy.mod.uk)

Royal Navy patrols